The 1983 Christchurch mayoral election was part of the New Zealand local elections held that same year. In 1983, election were held for the Mayor of Christchurch plus other local government positions. The polling was conducted using the standard first-past-the-post electoral method.

Background
Incumbent Mayor Hamish Hay was re-elected with an increased majority, defeating the deputy mayor Rex Lester of the Labour Party. In addition to Hay retaining the mayoralty there was a concurrent swing towards the Citizens' Association leaving the composition of the council at eleven seats to the Citizens' Association with eight to the Labour Party.

Earlier in the day Lester's home was broken into by burglars who stole his bicycle and sporting gear.

Results
The following table gives the election results:

Ward results
Candidates were also elected from wards to the Christchurch City Council.

References

Mayoral elections in Christchurch
1983 elections in New Zealand
Politics of Christchurch
October 1983 events in New Zealand
1980s in Christchurch